Tim Love is a chef best known for urban western cuisine. He is the owner and executive chef of several Fort Worth-area restaurants including the historic White Elephant Saloon, the Love Shack, the Woodshed Smokehouse, as well as his flagship restaurant Lonesome Dove Western Bistro in the historical Fort Worth Stockyards.

Career
Love opened two restaurants in 2006, Duce in Fort Worth and Lonesome Dove Western Bistro NYC in Manhattan's Chelsea district. Lonesome Dove Western Bistro NYC closed in March 2007 after six months, which included unfavorable reviews by the New York Times and New York magazine. Duce is sold in 2008 to a Chicago chef.

References

External links
 

Year of birth missing (living people)
Living people
Male chefs
Place of birth missing (living people)